Arthur Budd (27 December 1945 – 7 April 2012) was an Australian rules footballer who played for the South Melbourne Football Club in the Victorian Football League (VFL).

Notes

External links 

1945 births
2012 deaths
Australian rules footballers from Tasmania
Sydney Swans players
Clarence Football Club players